Admiral Sir Robert Lambert Baynes  (4 September 1796 – 7 September 1869) was a British Royal Navy admiral who as Commander-in-Chief, Pacific Station prevented the 1859 Pig War from escalating to a major conflict between the United States and the United Kingdom. Baynes joined the Royal Navy in 1810 and served in the Napoleonic Wars and the War of 1812. He took part in the Battle of Navarino in 1827 during the Greek War of Independence. He was promoted to captain in 1828 and commanded the vessels HMS Andromache and HMS Bellerophon and served as one of the senior officers in the Baltic Sea during the Crimean War. In 1857, he was made Commander-in-Chief, Pacific Station.

Early career
Baynes was born to Commander Thomas Baynes of the British Royal Navy and Edith Denman in Millbrook, Hampshire. Baynes followed his father and joined the Royal Navy on 19 April 1810 at the age of 14 and was assigned to  during the Napoleonic Wars. The ship patrolled off the coast of Catalonia where Baynes served as a midshipman until 1813.

On 2 December 1822 he was assigned shore duty at St Helena before joining  and HMS Tartarus on the South American station. On 8 July 1827, he was made the commanding officer of the sloop  on the Mediterranean Station, but returned to Asia as second captain, which was the flagship of Vice Admiral Edward Codrington.

Navarino and command
Baynes was aboard Asia, the British flagship during the Battle of Navarino on 20 October 1827 during the Greek War of Independence from the Ottoman Empire. A joint British-French-Russian fleet attacked a larger, joint Ottoman-Egyptian fleet in Navarino Bay. Asia led the line of battle and the steady fire by the British-French-Russian fleet led to their victory. Baynes distinguished himself during the battle and was promoted to captain on 8 July 1828. He was also made a companion of the Bath, a knight in the Greek Order of the Redeemer and received two other honours.

As a post-captain, Baynes was not given a command immediately was only assigned to command the 26-gun HMS Andromache on the Cape Station beginning 2 February 1838. He remained aboard the ship until March 1843, after which he was placed on half-pay. On 8 July 1846, he married Frances Denman, the daughter of Lord Denman, Lord Chief Justice. Baynes was reactivated and from 23 September 1847 to 7 November 1850, he commanded HMS Bellerophon a troopship that was assigned first to the Western Station, then the Mediterranean. Baynes was promoted to rear admiral on 7 February 1855 and he was the third in command in the Baltic Sea during the final year of the Crimean War in 1855.

Pacific Station and final years
He was appointed Commander-in-Chief, Pacific Station in on 8 July 1857, with his flag aboard . Baynes arrived as the gold rush in the British Pacific Northwest was happening and the Royal Navy was expected to enforce the laws enacted by the Governor of the Colony of Vancouver Island, James Douglas. While Baynes was away at Callao, Peru, the San Juan border dispute erupted. On 27 July 1859, United States troops under the command of Brigadier-General William Selby Harney landed on San Juan Island off the Colony of Vancouver Island at the behest of 22 American settlers who claimed to be threatened. The settlers had killed a pig that belonged to the Hudson's Bay Company, and feared British punishment. San Juan Island was British territory, and though the British Ambassador to the United States Lord Lyons initially sought to conquer an American-held island that the British also laid claim to, he ordered Baynes to assist but not to escalate the issue. Douglas also sought military intervention, who demanded the landing of Royal Marines on the island. Baynes refused and his patient handling of the situation led to joint-occupation of the island until a formal decision could be made. In 1872, the British recognized American sovereignty over the island.

After the gold rush and the San Juan dispute, Baynes sought to transfer the headquarters of the Pacific Station to the North Pacific. Esquimalt was Baynes' suggestion in 1859, to which the Admiralty agreed in 1862. On 18 April 1860 he was made a knight commander of the Bath. He remained Commander-in-Chief, Pacific Station until 1861. He returned to the United Kingdom and never held command again, though he was promoted to vice-admiral of the blue on 5 August 1861. He was made vice admiral of the red in 1863 and admiral in 1865.

Baynes Sound in British Columbia is named for him, and the town of Ganges on Saltspring Island and the waters offshore, Ganges Harbour, are named for his flagship, Ganges. He died in Upper Norwood on 7 September 1869, and was buried at West Norwood Cemetery.

Citations

Sources
 
 
 
 
 
 
 
 

1796 births
1869 deaths
Knights Commander of the Order of the Bath
Pre-Confederation British Columbia people
British military personnel of the Greek War of Independence
Royal Navy personnel of the Crimean War
Pig War (1859)
Royal Navy admirals
Burials at West Norwood Cemetery
Military personnel from Southampton
People from Southampton (district)